The Consolidated General Order was a book of workhouse regulations which governed how workhouses should be run in England and Wales.

References

Poor Law in Britain and Ireland